Valley of Tears (Emek HaBakha), (Series original name: , Sha‘at Ne'ila – meaning "the hour of Ne'ila") is an Israeli television mini-series directed by Yaron Zilberman based on a screenplay by Ron Leshem and starring Aviv Alush, Joy Rieger and Lior Ashkenazi. Development of the series lasted about a decade and its filming took place over 52 days starting on July 21, 2019. The premiere episode of the first season aired on Kan 11 on October 19, 2020. It was subsequently licensed by HBO Max, airing on November 12, 2020.

The series depicts the battles of the Yom Kippur War, with the first season focusing on the northern front of the war, and a second season focusing on the 1982 lebanon war is reportedly being filmed as of march 2022. The series has been described as one of the most expensive television series in Israel, with advanced technologies used to recreate the battles, including the Battle of the Valley of Tears, and the cost of each episode reaching one million dollars.

Synopsis 
On October 6, 1973, the Yom Kippur War broke out, when Arab states led by Egypt and Syria launched a surprise invasion and almost defeated Israel on the holiest day in the Jewish calendar: Yom Kippur. The story is told from the perspective of three characters, thrown into the heart of battle and war, whose effects are intoxicating and addictive.

Cast

Main
 Aviv Alush as Lieutenant Yoav Mazoz
 Shahar Tavoch as Corporal Avinoam Shapira
 Maor Schwitzer as Corporal Melakhi Bardugo
 Ofer Hayoun as Corporal Marco Dolzi
 Imri Biton as Corporal Jackie Alush
 Omer Perelman Striks as Staff Sergeant Nimrod Caspi
 Joy Rieger as Lieutenant Dafna Hirshberg
 Lior Ashkenazi as Meni Ben-Dror
 Lee Biran as Private Yoni Ben-Dror

Recurring
 Ido Bartal as Lieutenant Aviram
 Ami Smolartchik as Bentzi
 Lidor Edri as Riki Dolzi
 Ofri Biterman as Lieutenant Elad
 Tom Gal as Staff Sergeant Fiksman
 Ohad Knoller as Colonel Meir Almogi
 Tom Hagi as Sergeant Shendori
 Tom Avni as Captain Tamir

Production
Production started on July 21, 2019, with filming in Hebrew. It was Israel's highest-budgeted program, with Deadline Hollywood reporting that each episode cost around $1 million. A number of "the most prominent Israeli novelists in Israel" were involved in the script. It was produced by WestEnd Films, Endemol Shine Israel, United King and KAN. Before filming began, there were ten years of development with Moshe Edery at United King. After the ten years needed to get the process fully financed, the filming took place in the Golan Heights. At one point, filming was stopped for three weeks due to nearby fighting in Syria.

The cost was attributed to the battle scenes and also the creatives hired for the project. For filming, Ron Leshem and Amit Cohen "studied Israeli army lingo and thousands of soldier testimonies. They also found and rehabilitated tanks that were actually used in the war with the help of Israel Defense Forces technicians, who outfitted them with new engines."

Episodes

Reception 
Release of the series in Israel prompted what The New York Times described as "an intense public reckoning with the scope of war trauma and the treatment of survivors" by exposing a younger generation to battlefield sacrifices and reliving a period so painful that Israeli culture rarely deals with it. The series focused new attention on war veterans suffering from post-traumatic stress disorder, and also generated criticism for historical inaccuracies.

Release 
On October 13, 2020, distributor WestEnd Films announced it had sold global rights to the series to HBO Max. It began streaming on HBO Max in the United States on November 12.

Hollywood Suite announced in November 2020 that it had acquired broadcast rights to the series in Canada, with broadcasts beginning December 19. This comes despite HBO Max's acquisition of global rights, as in most cases the Canadian rights to these programs are assumed by Crave.

References

External links 
 Valley of Tears on Israeli Public Broadcasting Corporation website
 "Valley of Tears"  on SeriesMania.com
 

Hebrew-language television series
Yom Kippur War
2020 Israeli television series debuts
2020 Israeli television series endings
War television series
Israeli drama television series
Television shows set in Israel
Television series set in 1973
Kan 11 original programming